is a passenger railway station in located in the city of Suzuka,  Mie Prefecture, Japan, operated by the private railway operator Kintetsu Railway.

Lines
Hiratachō Station is a terminus of the Suzuka Line, and is located 8.2 rail kilometers from the opposing terminus of the line at Ise-Wakamatsu Station.

Station layout
The station was consists of a single side platform served by a single track.

Platforms

Adjacent stations

History
Hiratachō Station was opened on April 8, 1963  when the Suzuka Line was extended from Suzukashi Station. PiTaPa usage commenced from April 1, 2007.

Passenger statistics
In fiscal 2019, the station was used by an average of 3248 passengers daily (boarding passengers only).

Surrounding area
Hiratachō Station is at the center of Suzuka's main commercial and shopping area. Nearby lie several large malls, including: the Aeon Suzuka Shopping Center (also known as Bell City, the largest shopping center in the prefecture), the Suzuka Hunter Shopping Center, and Loc Town Suzuka. Also nearby is Suzuka Circuit; the only direct access via public transportation is by taxi. Going by bus requires an intermediate transfer. Shiroko Station is closer to the circuit.

Other points of interest include:
 Mie Prefectural Hiino Senior High School
 Suzuka Junior/Senior High School (private)
 Honda - Suzuka Plant

See also
List of railway stations in Japan

References

External links

 Kintetsu - Hiratachō Station 

Railway stations in Japan opened in 1963
Railway stations in Mie Prefecture
Stations of Kintetsu Railway
Suzuka, Mie